The 2021–22 Merrimack Warriors Men's ice hockey season was the 67th season of play for the program, the 33rd at the Division I level, and the 33rd season in the Hockey East conference. The Warriors represented Merrimack College and were coached by Scott Borek, in his 4th season.

Season
Merrimack entered the season having posted losing records in each of the previous nine seasons. Early in the season it appeared that trend would continue when the Warriors lost four consecutive games and then turned to a freshman goaltender to try and salvage their season. Hugo Ollas had a bit of a rough go at first, but he helped stabilize the back end for Merrimack and enabled the team to play .500 hockey in November and December.

While their record was still under water, the team had a bigger problem to contend with after returning from the winter break. A pair of games against Clarkson and St. Lawrence were cancelled due to COVID-19. Bentley was swiftly added to the schedule and kicked off a 5-game winning streak that saw Merrimack score four victories over ranked teams.

The quality wins earned the Warriors the first appearance in the national rankings in years and made it possible for their supporters to hope for a tournament bid. Unfortunately, their time in the top-20 was short-lived and Merrick lost their very next game. The team flirted with the rankings for most of the remainder of the season, but sweep at the hands of Northeastern in the regular season finale ended any chance of an at-large bid.

Entering the postseason, Merrimack knew they would likely have to win the Hockey East championship in order to make the NCAA tournament. After a solid win over Maine in the opening round, the Warriors travelled to Lowell to take on the River Hawks. Despite outshooting their opponents, Ollas and Borgiel combined to allow 7 goals and the Warriors were drubbed out of contention. Regardless of the sour end, this was the most successful season for the program in a decade and was Scott Borek's best season behind the bench since 1997.

Departures

Recruiting

Roster
As of August 24, 2021.

Standings

Schedule and results

|-
!colspan=12 style=";" | Regular Season

|-
!colspan=12 style=";" |

Scoring statistics

Goaltending statistics

Rankings

Note: USCHO did not release a poll in week 24.

Awards and honors

References

2021–22
Merrimack
Merrimack
Merrimack
Merrimack